Euptera ginettae is a butterfly in the family Nymphalidae. It is found in the north-eastern part of the Democratic Republic of the Congo.

References

Butterflies described in 2005
Euptera
Endemic fauna of the Democratic Republic of the Congo